Caty McNally and Jessica Pegula were the defending champions, but chose not to participate.

Usue Maitane Arconada and Caroline Dolehide won the title, defeating Jaimee Fourlis and Valentini Grammatikopoulou in the final, 6–7(2–7), 6–2, [10–8].

Seeds

Draw

Draw

References
Main Draw

Mercer Tennis Classic - Doubles